MacCumhaill Park is a GAA stadium in Ballybofey, County Donegal, Ireland.

It is the home ground of the Seán MacCumhaills club and Donegal's Gaelic football and hurling teams.

The ground is named after Seán MacCumhaill and had a capacity of 13,000, but that was reduced to 12,250 after a safety audit report was released in February 2012. Donegal GAA announced in November 2012 plans to restore the capacity to 18,000, Work got underway in February 2013. and the necessary works were completed by late March 2013.

References

See also
 List of Gaelic Athletic Association stadiums
 List of stadiums in Ireland by capacity

Ballybofey
Donegal GAA venues